Metaperiaptodes is a genus of longhorn beetles of the subfamily Lamiinae, containing the following species:

 Metaperiaptodes granulatus (Aurivillius, 1908)
 Metaperiaptodes samarensis Breuning, 1974

References

Lamiini